The following are the winners of the 16th annual (1989) Origins Award, presented at Origins 1990:

External links
 1989 Origins Awards Winners

1989 awards
1989 awards in the United States
Origins Award winners